Gikambura is a settlement in Kenya's Kiambu County.

References

See also 
 Satellite Images of Gikambura
 Transportation to  Gikambura 

Populated places in Central Province (Kenya)
Kiambu County